Halsbach  is a river of Bavaria, Germany. It flows into the Alz in Burgkirchen an der Alz.

See also
List of rivers of Bavaria

References

Rivers of Bavaria
Rivers of Germany